Runnels is a surname, and may refer to:
Cody Garrett Runnels (born 1985), American wrestler and actor known as Cody Rhodes
Dustin Patrick Runnels (born 1969), American wrestler known as Goldust or Dustin Rhodes
Hardin Richard Runnels (1820–1873), American politician; governor of Texas 1857–1859
Harold L. Runnels (1924–1980), American politician from New Mexico; U.S. representative 1971–80
Hiram Runnels (1796–1857), American politician from Mississippi; governor of Mississippi 1833–35
J. D. Runnels (b. 1984), American professional football player
Mike Runnels (1945-2015), American politician from New Mexico
Pete Runnels (1928–1991), American professional baseball player
Randolph Runnels (b. 1827) American lawman in Panama
Terri Runnels (b. 1966), American professional wrestling manager
Tom Runnels (b. 1934), American professional football player
Virgil Riley Runnels, Jr. (1945–2015), American wrestler known as "The American Dream" Dusty Rhodes

See also
 Runnels County, Texas
 Runnells (disambiguation)